Bădiceni is a commune in Soroca District, Moldova. It is composed of two villages, Bădiceni and Grigorăuca.

References

Communes of Soroca District
Soroksky Uyezd
Soroca County (Romania)